Maculotriton serriale is a species of sea snail, a marine gastropod mollusk in the family Muricidae, the murex snails or rock snails.

It is difficult to find differences between  Maculotriton serriale and Maculotriton digitalis (and its synonyms) when one considers shell characters only.

Distribution
This species occurs in the Red Sea, in the Indian Ocean off Aldabra, Chagos, Madagascar, the Mascarene Basin and off New Zealand  and North and East Australia.

References

 Houart R., Kilburn R.N. & Marais A.P. (2010) Muricidae. pp. 176–270, in: Marais A.P. & Seccombe A.D. (eds), Identification guide to the seashells of South Africa. Volume 1. Groenkloof: Centre for Molluscan Studies. 376 pp

External links
 

Maculotriton
Gastropods described in 1834